Athletic Solomons (AS), also known as Solomon Islands Athletics Association, is the governing body for the sport of athletics in the Solomon Islands.

History 
In the 1960th the existence of an organisation called British Solomon Islands Amateur Athletic Association is documented.  Baddeley Devesi, who later served as the first Governor-General of the Solomon Islands after independence, is reported to be elected secretary to this association in 1967.

After independence, Athletic Solomons was founded in 1980 (most probably as Solomon Islands Amateur Athletic Union), and was affiliated to the IAAF in the year 1981.

Former president was ex decathlete James Iroga.  Current president is Martin Rara.  He was elected in November 2012.

Affiliations 
International Association of Athletics Federations (IAAF)
Oceania Athletics Association (OAA)
Moreover, it is part of the following national organisations:
National Olympic Committee of Solomon Islands (NOCSI)

National records 
Athletic Solomons maintains the Solomon Islands records in athletics.

References

Solomon Islands
Sport in the Solomon Islands
Athletics in the Solomon Islands
National governing bodies for athletics
Sports organizations established in 1980
1980 establishments in the Solomon Islands